Mathilde Pincus (1917 – March 5, 1988) was an American music supervisor. She was raised in Philadelphia, Pennsylvania. Pincus was honored with the Special Tony Award at the 30th Tony Awards. She died in March 1988 in Dania, Florida, at the age of 71.

References

External links 

1917 births
1988 deaths
People from Philadelphia
American music people
American theatre people
Special Tony Award recipients
20th-century American women